Black Patch may refer to:

Black Patch Park, Smethwick, England
Black Patch Tobacco Wars
Black Patch (film), a 1957 American Western film